Joe Palooka in the Counterpunch is a 1949 American film directed by Reginald Le Borg. It was one in the series of Joe Palooka films for Monogram starring Leon Errol.

It was co-written by Cy Endfield.

Cast 
 Leon Errol as Knobby Walsh  
 Joe Kirkwood, Jr. as Joe Palooka  
 Elyse Knox as Anne Howe  
  as Anton Kindel
 Sheila Ryan as Myra Madison 
 Frank Sully as Looie
 Ian Wolfe as Prof. Lilliquist 
 Walter Sande as Austin
 Douglass Dumbrille as Capt. Lance
 Douglas Fowley as Thurston
 Eddie Gribbon as Canvasback
 Ralph Graves as Dr. Colman
 Roland Dupree as Bellboy
 Gertrude Messinger as Nurse
 Pedro de Cordoba as Museum Caretaker

External links

Joe Palooka in the Counterpunch at IMDb
Joe Palooka in the Counterpunch at TCMDB

1949 films
1940s sports films
American black-and-white films
American boxing films
Films directed by Reginald Le Borg
Monogram Pictures films
Films based on American comics
1940s American films
Joe Palooka films